Csaba Pléh (born 29 November 1945) is a Hungarian psychologist and linguist, professor at the Department of Cognitive Science, Budapest University of Technology and Economics.

Academic career
He graduated from the Eötvös Loránd University where he earned his degrees in psychology (1969) and linguistics (1973). In 1970 he received his PhD in psychology. He became Candidate of Psychological Science in 1984 and  Doctor of Psychological Science in 1997. He obtained his habilitation in 1998. He became a corresponding member of the Hungarian Academy of Sciences is 1998, a full member in 2004.

See also
Hungarian Academy of Sciences
Cognitive Science and Neuropsychology Program of Szeged
Institute of Psychology (Szeged)
Péter Érdi

References

External links
 Personal homepage: World of Cognition
 List of publications
 Curriculum vitae

Hungarian psychologists
Linguists from Hungary
Members of the Hungarian Academy of Sciences
1945 births
Living people